Kaie Kand (born 31 March 1984 in Orissaare) is a retired Estonian heptathlete. Her personal best score is 5979 points, achieved in May 2009 in Götzis. In 2009, she set an Estonian national indoor record in the pentathlon (4580 points). Her coach was Remigija Nazarovienė.

Achievements

References

External links
 

1984 births
Living people
People from Orissaare
Athletes (track and field) at the 2008 Summer Olympics
Olympic athletes of Estonia
Estonian heptathletes
Estonian sportswomen
World Athletics Championships athletes for Estonia